Super Eurobeat presents Hyper Euro Max is the first remix album released by Japanese girlgroup MAX, featuring eurobeat-style remixes of the group's songs. It was released on June 28, 2000 on the Avex Trax label, and reached number five on the Oricon weekly charts.

Track list
Ano Natsu e to (Time Go Go remix) (あの夏へと; And to That Summer)
Hikari no Veil (traditional mix) (閃光 -ひかり- のVEIL; Veil of Light)
Ginga no Chikai (Eurosenti remix) (銀河の誓い; Vow of the Milky Way)
Issho ni... (Sweet Mix) (一緒に・・・; Together)
Love Impact (melodic remix)
Love Is Dreaming (Eurobeat mix)
Shinin'on-Shinin'love (aggressive mix)
Give Me a Shake (Euro-Power mix)
HARMONY (Eurobeat Mix) (from the album Maximum II)
I will (Sentimental Mix) (from the single Shinin'on-Shinin'love)
Grace of My Heart (Maximum mix)
Ride On Time (Eurobeat mix)

Charts
Album - Oricon Sales Chart (Japan)

MAX (band) albums
2000 remix albums
Avex Group remix albums